The following are the national records in Olympic weightlifting in Greece. Records are maintained in each weight class for the snatch lift, clean and jerk lift, and the total for both lifts by the Hellenic Weightlifting Federation (Ελληνική Ομοσπονδία Άρσης Βαρών).

Current records

Men

Women

Historical records

Men (1998–2018)

Women

References
General
 Greek Weightlifting Records – Men 28 November 2021 updated
 Greek Weightlifting Records – Women 12 March 2022 updated
Specific

External links
 Hellenic Weightlifting Federation

Records
Greek
Olympic weightlifting
weightlifting